The Mercedes-Benz GLA is a subcompact luxury crossover SUV manufactured and marketed by Mercedes-Benz over two generations. It is essentially the SUV equivalent of the A-Class, and the smallest SUV marketed by the brand. The production version was revealed in August 2013 ahead of the 2013 Frankfurt Auto Show in September 2013. 

The GLA is powered by a range of petrol and diesel 4-cylinder engines, and comes in either front-wheel drive or all-wheel drive, the latter marketed by Mercedes as 4Matic.

The GLA nameplate aligns with Mercedes SUV nomenclature, where GL stands for Geländewagen (German for off-road vehicle) and the A designates its overall place in the Mercedes range, in this class, the smallest or A-Class.

Concept models

Concept GLA (2013)
The Concept GLA debuted in the 2013 Auto Shanghai and is powered by a 2.0-litre turbo petrol engine rated , 7-speed dual clutch automatic transmission, driving all wheels via the Mercedes-Benz 4Matic system. The concept included front headlamps with a laser-beam projector, two cameras housed in the front roof rail, 20-inch wheels and fibre-optic ambient interior lighting.

Concept GLA 45 AMG (2013)

Concept GLA 45 AMG (2016)

First generation (X156; 2013)

The production X156 GLA is closely based on the Concept GLA design and was unveiled at the 2013 Frankfurt Motor Show. Orders had been taken beginning from the end of November 2013, and arrived in dealer showrooms during 2014, with Japan and US in the autumn.

At launch, Mercedes-Benz claimed the vehicle was the most aerodynamic in its segment, with a Cd figure of 0.29. The GLA’s platform makes use of a strut-type front suspension and a multi-link rear setup, and an electric power steering.

Nissan marketed a restyled variant of the GLA from 2016 to 2019 through its Infiniti brand in North America as the Infiniti Q30 and QX30, sharing the GLA mechanicals with revised exterior sheet metal. The Infiniti derivatives were produced between 2016 and 2019.

Facelift
Mercedes unveiled a mid-life facelift of the GLA at the Detroit Motor Show in January 2017. The updated model came with some cosmetic tweaks on the outside, including a redesigned grille, new front and rear bumpers and updated 18-inch alloy wheels. Moreover, the bi-xenon headlamps of the previous models were replaced by all LED units, while the taillights too were all LED and got a new design pattern. A new Canyon Beige colour option was also added. The interiors carried forward the same dashboard layout, though the infotainment system received a new 8.0-inch screen that was located on top of the centre console in a free-standing layout.

GLA 45 AMG
The design of GLA 45 AMG is based on Concept GLA 45 AMG, with AMG sports suspension (MacPherson strut front axle with stiffer steering knuckles, four-link rear axle, optimised elastokinematics, specially tuned spring/damper units, bigger anti-roll bars), electromechanical AMG speed-sensitive sports steering, AMG high-performance braking system (ventilated, cross-drilled brake discs with grey- or red-painted brake calipers), 3-stage ESP with "SPORT Handling" mode, ESP Curve Dynamic Assist, 5-twin-spoke AMG light-alloy wheels painted titanium grey with high-sheen finish and 235/45 R19 tyres (optional 10-spoke AMG light-alloy wheels in 2 a choice of 2 colours (titanium grey with high-sheen finish, matt black with high-sheen rim flange) 235/40 R 20 tyres), AMG front apron with front splitter in matt titanium grey, AMG 'twin blade' radiator grille in matt titanium grey, black flics (air deflector elements) above the large exterior cooling air intakes, bi-xenon headlamps, side sill panels with titanium grey inserts, 'TURBO AMG' lettering on the front wings and the aluminium roof rails, rear diffuser insert with titanium grey trim, rectangular chrome-plated tailpipe trim at the twin tailpipes.

Launch models of the AMG are sold as "Edition 1", available for one year from market launch, and include a high-gloss black Aerodynamics package with larger front splitter, additional flics in the front apron, and rear aerofoil. The vehicle was unveiled at the 2014 North American International Auto Show with sales from the summer of 2014.

Technical details
The GLA shares its platform with the A-Class and B-Class, with a similar range of petrol and diesel engines. Availability of engines varies between markets.

Engines

Transmissions

Marketing
As part of a partnership between Mercedes-Benz and Nintendo, the two companies released a television commercial featuring Mario driving a Mercedes-Benz GLA in the Japanese market in May 2014 to coincide with the line's Japanese launch. Additional commercials featuring other Mario characters in the same style were released in November 2014, culminating in the GLA becoming a selectable vehicle in Mario Kart 8 and its Switch port with Mercedes' W 25 Silver Arrow and 300 SL Roadster also being included.

Second generation (H247; 2019)

The second generation, introduced on 11 December 2019 at Mercedes media event, is revised from the previous generation. The chassis number, 247, is shared with W247 B-Class and X247 GLB. The GLA uses the second generation MFA2 platform and completes the eight-model W177 A-Class compact based line-up. 

The H247 GLA has 116 mm more headroom, 45 mm more elbow room and 43 mm more rear shoulder room. The ground clearance has been raised by 9 mm to 143 mm and the front seats are positioned 140 mm higher than in the W177 A-Class. Despite this, there is an added  of front-seat headroom compared to its predecessor. 

As with other MFA2-based models, the GLA has suspension with MacPherson struts up front and either a torsion beam or multi-link suspension at the rear. Variable damping control is optional. Inside, the GLA is similar to other MFA2 Mercedes models, featuring a dashboard with a free-standing digital display panel, the MBUX infotainment system, as well as other tech such as a colour Heads-Up Display. 

A battery electric version called the Mercedes EQA was introduced in 2020 as the third battery electric SUV from Mercedes-Benz.

Technical details

Powertrain
The second generation GLA has four petrol and four diesel models at launch. The GLA 250 e plug-in hybrid model was revealed in March 2020. The model range for the United States is GLA 250, GLA 4MATIC, and Mercedes-AMG GLA 35 4MATIC.

Transmissions
Only GLA 180 and 200 uses 7-speed 7G-DCT automatic transmission while the rest of engine range uses 8-speed 8G-DCT automatic transmission. The GLA 35 4MATIC AMG uses 8-speed AMG Speedshift automatic transmission. The GLA 250 e 8-speed automatic 8F-DCT. No manual transmission option is available anymore.

Sales

References

External links

GLA-Class
Cars introduced in 2013
Front-wheel-drive vehicles
All-wheel-drive vehicles
Mini sport utility vehicles
Luxury crossover sport utility vehicles
2020s cars